The ICC Awards are an annual set of sports awards for international cricket, which recognise and honour the best international cricket players of the previous 12 months. The awards were introduced by the International Cricket Council (ICC) in 2004. Between 2009 and 2014 the awards were known, for sponsorship reasons, as the LG ICC Awards.

Men's awards

ICC Men's Cricketer of the Year

ICC Men's Test Cricketer of the Year

ICC Men's ODI Cricketer of the Year

ICC Men's T20I Cricketer of the Year

ICC Men's Emerging Cricketer of the Year

ICC Men's Associate Cricketer of the Year

ICC Men's Test Team of the Year

ICC Men's ODI Team of the Year

ICC Men's T20I Team of the Year

Women's awards

ICC Women's Cricketer of the Year

ICC Women's ODI Cricketer of the Year

ICC Women's T20I Cricketer of the Year

ICC Women's Emerging Cricketer of the Year

ICC Women's Associate Cricketer of the Year

ICC Women's ODI Team of the Year

ICC Women's T20I Team of the Year

Mixed awards

ICC Umpire of the Year

ICC Spirit of Cricket 
Described by the ICC as being awarded to the team most notable for "upholding the 'Spirit of the Game'", involving respect for:
Their opponents 
Their own captain and team
The role of the umpires
The game's traditional values

Teams

Players

Defunct awards

ICC Twenty20 International Performance of the Year 
In 2021, The award was succeeded by ICC T20I Player of the Year, which is given to a player based on his performance in the whole year.

Captain of the Year

Team of the Year

Women's Team of the Year

LG People's Choice Award

Fan's Moment of the Year

Monthly awards 
In January 2021, the ICC introduced "Player of the Month" awards to recognise cricketers, male and female, that performed best across all forms of international cricket each month. Nominees and winners are determined by an ICC panel of ex-players and journalists, with a public vote having a 10% contribution to the final results.

ICC Men's Player of the Month

ICC Women's Player of the Month

ICC Development Programme Awards 
In December 2016, ICC Development Programme Awards were announced for the ICC's Associate and Affiliate Members aimed at creating improving structures within the 95 member federations.

Past methodology 
The judging/voting period was originally from 1 August of the current year to 31 July of the next year. It then underwent two changes and used to take place between September of the current year and September of the next year.

The ICC Selection Committee comprised eminent former players (one chairman, four other members) who selected the finalists for the Cricketer of the Year, Test Player of the Year, ODI Player of the Year and the Emerging Player of the Year, as well as the final ICC Test Team of the Year and ICC ODI Team of the Year.

The final selection for the awards were previously voted on by an academy of 56 (expanded from 50 in 2004–05), which included current national team captains of Test playing nations (10), members of the Elite panel of ICC umpires and referees (18), prominent former players and cricket correspondents (28). In the event of a tie in the voting, awards are shared.

Awards by year 
 2004 ICC Awards
 2005 ICC Awards
 2006 ICC Awards
 2007 ICC Awards
 2008 ICC Awards
 2009 ICC Awards
 2010 ICC Awards
 2011 ICC Awards
 2012 ICC Awards
 2013 ICC Awards
 2014 ICC Awards
 2015 ICC Awards
 2016 ICC Awards
 2017 ICC Awards
 2018 ICC Awards
 2019 ICC Awards
 ICC Awards of the Decade
 2021 ICC Awards
 2022 ICC Awards

References 

Cricket awards and rankings